Easy Rider is the soundtrack to the cult classic 1969 film Easy Rider. The songs that make up the soundtrack were carefully selected to form a "musical commentary" within the film. The album of the soundtrack was released by ABC-Dunhill Records in August 1969 (catalog no. DSX 50063). It peaked at #6 on the Billboard album charts in September of that year, and was certified gold in January 1970.

Description
The songs on the soundtrack album are sequenced in the same order as they appear in the film, with the following differences:
"The Weight", as originally recorded by The Band for their 1968 debut album Music From Big Pink, was used in the film but could not be licensed for the soundtrack. To deal with this, ABC-Dunhill commissioned Smith, who recorded for the label at the time, to record a cover version of the song for the soundtrack album.
Two songs used in the film, Little Eva's "Let's Turkey Trot" and The Electric Flag's "Flash, Bam, Pow", were omitted from the soundtrack album.

Distribution of the album transferred from the ABC-Dunhill label to Warner Bros. Records' Reprise Records subsidiary (catalog no. MS 2026) in late 1969. Easy Rider subsequently went out of print, but was reissued in June 2000 by the Universal Music Group's MCA Records label, which had acquired the ABC and Dunhill labels in 1979.

Track listing
Most of the tracks on the Easy Rider soundtrack were previously released on other albums by their respective artists.

On LP, cassette and reel-to-reel releases of Easy Rider, tracks 1-5 appeared as side 1, and tracks 6-10 as side 2.
"The Pusher" (Hoyt Axton) – 5:49
Steppenwolf - Steppenwolf (1968)
"Born to Be Wild" (Mars Bonfire) – 3:37
Steppenwolf - Steppenwolf (1968)
"The Weight" (Jaime Robbie Robertson) – 4:29
Smith (1969)
"Wasn't Born to Follow" (Carole King/Gerry Goffin) – 2:03
The Byrds - The Notorious Byrd Brothers (1968)
"If You Want to Be a Bird (Bird Song)" (Antonia Duren) – 2:35
The Holy Modal Rounders - The Moray Eels Eat The Holy Modal Rounders (1969)
"Don't Bogart Me" (Elliot Ingber/Larry Wagner) – 3:05
Fraternity of Man - Fraternity of Man (1968)
"If 6 Was 9" (Jimi Hendrix) – 5:35
The Jimi Hendrix Experience - Axis: Bold as Love (1967)
"Kyrie Eleison/Mardi Gras (When the Saints)" (Traditional, arranged by David Axelrod) – 4:00
The Electric Prunes - Mass in F Minor (1968)
"It's Alright, Ma (I'm Only Bleeding)" (Bob Dylan) – 3:39
Roger McGuinn (1969)
"Ballad of Easy Rider" (Roger McGuinn/Bob Dylan) – 2:14
Roger McGuinn (1969)

2004 deluxe edition

Disc one
Remastered re-release of the original 1969 soundtrack.

Disc two - Something in the Air: 1967 – 1969
"Pushin' Too Hard"
The Seeds - The Seeds (1966)
"I Had Too Much to Dream (Last Night)"
The Electric Prunes - The Electric Prunes: I Had Too Much to Dream (Last Night) (1967)
"(We Ain't Got) Nothin' Yet"
Blues Magoos - Psychedelic Lollipop (1966)
"San Franciscan Nights"
Eric Burdon & The Animals - Winds of Change (1967)
"White Rabbit"
Jefferson Airplane - Surrealistic Pillow (1967)
"I Can See for Miles"
The Who - The Who Sell Out (1967)
"A Whiter Shade of Pale"
Procol Harum - Procol Harum (1967)
"Groovin'"
The Young Rascals - Groovin' (1967)
"High Flyin' Bird"
Richie Havens - Mixed Bag (1967)
"The Weight"
The Band - Music From Big Pink (1968)
"You Ain't Goin' Nowhere"
The Byrds - Sweetheart of the Rodeo (1968)
"Time Has Come Today"
The Chambers Brothers - The Time Has Come (1967)
"With a Little Help from My Friends"
Joe Cocker - With a Little Help from My Friends (1969)
"Summertime Blues"
Blue Cheer - Vincebus Eruptum (1968)
"Nights in White Satin"
The Moody Blues - Days of Future Passed (1967)
"Mendocino"
Sir Douglas Quintet - Mendocino (1969)
"Get Together"
The Youngbloods - The Youngbloods (1967)
"My Uncle"
The Flying Burrito Brothers - The Gilded Palace of Sin (1969)
"Something in the Air"
Thunderclap Newman - Hollywood Dream (1969)

Charts

References

Further reading

1969 soundtrack albums
Reprise Records soundtracks
Hip-O Records soundtracks
Dunhill Records soundtracks
Acid rock albums
Drama film soundtracks